Lucy Ellmann (born 18 October 1956) is an American-born British novelist based in Edinburgh, Scotland.

Biography
Her first book, Sweet Desserts, won the Guardian Fiction Prize. She is the daughter of the American biographer and literary critic Richard Ellmann and the feminist literary critic Mary Ellmann. She is married to the American writer Todd McEwen. Her fourth novel, Dot in the Universe, was longlisted for the Orange Prize for Fiction and shortlisted for the Believer Book Award. Her latest book, Ducks, Newburyport was short-listed for the Booker Prize in 2019. It won the 2019 Goldsmiths Prize and the 2020 James Tait Black Prize for Fiction.

Ellmann lectured and led seminars in Creative Writing at the University of Kent between September 2009 and July 2010.

Ellmann has been recognised with honours and fellowships, including the Royal Literary Fund; Queen Margaret University 2017/18; University of Dundee 2011/12; Queen Margaret University 2005–07; and been a Hawthornden Fellow and Hawthornden fellowship residence at Hawthornden Castle.

Notable works
Sweet Desserts (1988)
Varying Degrees of Hopelessness (1991)
The Spy Who Caught a Cold (screenplay, 1995)
Man or Mango? A Lament (1999)
Dot in the Universe (2003)
Doctors & Nurses (2006)
Mimi (2013)
Ducks, Newburyport (2019)
Things Are Against Us (2021)

References

Sources
  Retrieved October 8, 2018.

External links
 Lucy Ellmann at Bloomsbury.com
 New York Times review of Dot in the Universe
 Interview from The Daily Telegraph magazine
 Believer Book Awards finalists

1956 births
Living people
Academics of the University of Kent
Writers from Evanston, Illinois
American women novelists
American emigrants to England
English women novelists
Alumni of the Courtauld Institute of Art
Alumni of Falmouth University
Alumni of the University of Essex
20th-century American novelists
20th-century American women writers
21st-century American novelists
20th-century English novelists
21st-century English novelists
Novelists from Illinois
Writers from Edinburgh
Naturalised citizens of the United Kingdom
Goldsmiths Prize winners
American women academics
21st-century American women writers
20th-century English women
20th-century English people
21st-century English women